Manuel Palafox (born Puebla, 1886–1959) was a Mexican politician, soldier and intellectual.

Palafox studied in Puebla, his city of birth, and became an entrepreneur. In 1911, he joined the Liberation Army of the South (AWL) of Emiliano Zapata, initially to defend his home. He ascended the ranks and in 1914 became Zapata's most important advisor.

He led the negotiations with the Constitutional Army of Venustiano Carranza, which failed due to the obstinacy of the latter. The Zapatistas took the side of Pancho Villa at the Aguascalientes Convention, as a result of which Eulalio Gutiérrez was designated to be president. Palafox became minister of agriculture in the Gutiérrez cabinet. He allowed land partitionings and ensured that land that had been seized, which had in some cases been occupied for centuries, was returned to the legitimate owners.

Palafox, as an urban intellectual, was never popular with the Zapatistas and according to them too fond of shady intrigues. After he was dismissed as a minister in 1915, he attempted to negotiate with Carranza. Later he was the victim of a rumor about his sexuality which led to Zapata to nearly have him shot—however he instead transferred him to Tochimilco under Magana. In 1920, he took the amnesty offered by Carranza for former Zapatistas and he was incorporated in the Mexican army as a general.

In 1932, he ran unsuccessfully for the governor of Puebla, after which he withdrew himself from public life.

References
 Manuel Palafox at the Nevada Observer

1886 births
1959 deaths
People from Puebla
Zapatistas
Mexican Secretaries of Agriculture
Mexican generals